The Dean of Cashel is the head of the Chapter of the Cathedral Church of St John the Baptist and St Patrick's Rock, Cashel, one of the Church of Ireland cathedrals of the united Diocese of Cashel, Ferns and Ossory.

The Deanery is vacant.

It is not known when the Chapter of Cashel was established, but in 1224 Pope Honorius III confirmed twelve Canons and a Dean in the historic cathedral of St Patrick, located at the Rock of Cashel. For centuries the Chapter consisted of five dignitaries and six prebendaries, the Archbishop of Cashel being one, holding the prebend of Glankeen as parcel of his see. The prebend of Crohane was united to the archdeaconry of Cashel for more than 200 years.

Following the Reformation, the Church of Ireland retained the cathedral until it was closed for worship in 1721. Meanwhile, the old parish Church of St John in Cashel was removed and the present Georgian Cathedral completed in 1784.

The most recent dean, the Very Reverend Gerald G. Field, was instituted and installed in February 2014.

List of deans of Cashel

Pre-Reformation 
 : Thomas.
 before 1237–1238: David mac Cellaig Ó Gilla Pátraic, O.P. (afterwards Bishop of Cloyne, then Archbishop of Cashel).
 unknown–1253: David Mac Cerbaill , O.Cist. (afterwards Archbishop of Cashel); died 1289.
 1254–unknown: Thaddeus O'Brien.
 1260–unknown: Keran, or Kyran.
 1267–unknown: Roland.
 –1276: David.
 : Antonius.
 1302-1306: Philip Broder.
 1346–unknown: Richard Fitzjohn.
 1402–1412: Richard Barry.
 1429–1437: David O'Dwyer.
 1452–unknown: Cornelius.
 1467–1485: John Hedian or O'Hedian.
 unknown–1558: Peter Butler.

Post-Reformation 
 1558/9–unknown: William Stapleton.
 unknown–1583/4: John McCody
 1583/84–1605: Robert Coman
 1605–1606: Dermot O'Meara (resigned)
 1606–1607: John Todd (afterwards Bishop of Down and Connor and Bishop of Dromore).
 1608–1633: Lewis Jones (also Dean of Ardagh and afterwards Bishop of Killaloe).
 1633–1638: William Chappell (afterwards Bishop of Cork and Ross).
 1638/9–unknown: Richard Howlett
 1660/1–1670/1: Essex Digby (afterwards Bishop of Dromore).
 1671–1675: Caesar Williamson
 1676–1693/4: John Glandie
 1693/4-1706: Henry Price
 1706–1713: William Mullart
 1714–1736: John Wetherby
 1736–1758: William Gore (afterwards Bishop of Clonfert and Kilmacduagh).
 1758–1769: Thomas Paul
 1769–1787: John Jebb
 1787–1829: Joseph Palmer
 1829–1856: Samuel Adams
 1857–1861: Ogle William Moore (afterwards Dean of Clogher, 1862)
 1862–1873: John Cotter MacDonnell (later Canon Residentiary of Peterborough, 1883–1902)
 1873–1878: William Pakenham Walsh (afterwards Bishop of Ossory, Ferns and Leighlin, 1878)
 1878–1890: Arthur Henry Leech
 1890–1908: George Purcell White
 1908–1913: Maurice William Day (afterwards Dean of Waterford, 1913)
 1913–1916: Robert Jones Sylvester Devenish
 1916–1924: William Chadwick Bourchier
 1924–1946: Joseph Talbot.
 1946–1960: Robert Wyse Jackson (afterwards Bishop of Limerick, Ardfert and Aghadoe).
 1961–1973: Charles Wolfe
 1973–1983: David George Alexander Clarke (Prebendary of Newcastle, St Patrick's Dublin 1965–1989).
 1984–1994: Gerald Mark David Woodworth
 1995–2013: Philip John Knowles
 2014–2021: Gerald G. Field

Notes

References

 
 
 
 

 
Diocese of Cashel and Ossory
Cashel